Arne Linderholm (22 February 1916 – 20 November 1986) was a Swedish football midfielder who played for Sweden in the 1938 FIFA World Cup. He also played for IK Sleipner.

References

External links
FIFA profile

1916 births
1986 deaths
Swedish footballers
Sweden international footballers
Association football midfielders
1938 FIFA World Cup players